Richard Hardstaff (12 January 1863 – 18 April 1932) was an English cricketer who played first-class cricket for Nottinghamshire from 1887 to 1899  and played as a professional in the Lancashire League for Rawtenstall.

Cricket career
Hardstaff made his first-class debut for Nottinghamshire against Marylebone Cricket Club (MCC) in June 1887. Batting at number 10, he made his highest score of 60 in a County Championship match versus Derbyshire in June 1896. In the same match Hardstaff recorded his best bowling of 8-53. Hardstaff played in 40 matches as professional for Lancashire League club Rawtenstall from 1893 to 1900.

References

External links
Wisden obituaries of 1932
Selston cricketers

1863 births
1932 deaths
People from Selston
Cricketers from Nottinghamshire
English cricketers
Nottinghamshire cricketers
English cricketers of 1890 to 1918
English cricketers of 1864 to 1889